Mamianiella is a genus of fungi in the family Gnomoniaceae.

References

External links 

 Mamianiella at Index Fungorum

Gnomoniaceae
Sordariomycetes genera